"Sunrise" is a song by English musical group Simply Red. It was released on 17 March 2003 as the first single from their eighth studio album, Home (2003), as well as the first single from frontman Mick Hucknall's new record label, simplyred.com. The song peaked at number seven on the UK Singles Chart, number three in Canada, and number one on the US Billboard Hot Dance Club Play chart.

Content
The song contains samples of Hall & Oates's 1981 hit "I Can't Go for That (No Can Do)" and incorporates some of its lyrics.

Reception
David Jeffries of AllMusic panned the track, calling it the worst on its parent album. He added: "Hall & Oates get sampled and credited, but the vocal hook from Ace's "How Long" gets lifted without acknowledgment. It sounds as shoddy as one of the song-combining "mash-up" bootlegs that swept through the U.K., and could be a cover-up for Hucknall's lack of songwriting ideas."

Video
The main success of "Sunrise" was due in part to the sensual video being shot on the outskirts of Rio de Janeiro. It was filmed in February 2003 at the Das Canoas house designed by the renowned Brazilian architect Oscar Niemeyer for himself, which has since been open to the public.

Track listings

UK CD1
 "Sunrise" – 3:18
 "Sunrise" (Love to Infinity classic mix) – 6:50
 "Sunrise" (Love to Infinity club mix) – 7:51
 Enhanced section: video/making of the video

UK CD2
 "Sunrise" (live at Ronnie Scott's)
 "Positively 4th Street" (live at Ronnie Scott's)
 "Home Loan Blues" (live at Ronnie Scott's)

European CD single
 "Sunrise" – 3:18
 "Sunrise" (Love to Infinity classic mix) – 6:50
 Enhanced section: video/making of the video

Canadian CD single
 "Sunrise" – 3:18
 "Sunrise" (Motivo Hi-Lectro radio mix) – 3:25
 "Sunrise" (Love to Infinity radio mix) – 3:11
 "Sunrise" (Motivo Hi-Lectro mix) – 6:14
 "Sunrise" (Motivo Hi-Lectro dub) – 6:42
 "Sunrise" (Love to Infinity club mix) – 7:51
 "Sunrise" (Love to Infinity classic mix) – 6:50
 "Sunrise" (video)
 Making of the video

Australian CD single
 "Sunrise" – 3:18
 "Sunrise" (Motivo Hi-Lectro radio mix) – 3:25
 "Sunrise" (Love to Infinity radio mix) – 3:11
 "Sunrise" (live) – 3:18
 "Positively 4th Street" (live) – 4:32

Credits and personnel
Credits are lifted from the Home album booklet.

Studio
 Recorded at Metropolis Studios (London, England)

Personnel
 Mick Hucknall – words, music, original version production
 Daryl Hall – words, music ("I Can't Go for That (No Can Do)")
 John Oates – words, music ("I Can't Go for That (No Can Do)")
 Sara Allen – words, music ("I Can't Go for That (No Can Do)")
 Andy Wright – production, mixing
 Gota Yashiki – original version production

Charts

Weekly charts

Year-end charts

Certifications

Release history

See also
 List of Billboard Hot Dance Music/Club Play number ones of 2003

References

External links
 Lyrics of this song

2003 singles
2003 songs
Simply Red songs
Songs written by Daryl Hall
Songs written by John Oates
Songs written by Mick Hucknall
Songs written by Sara Allen